The following is a list of burial places of Ottoman sultans in Istanbul, Turkey.

References

Burial places
Ottoman sultans
Ottoman sultans
Ottoman sultans
Burial places,Ottoman Sultans